Camden Road railway station in the London Borough of Camden, north London, is operated by London Overground. It is on the North London line and in Travelcard Zone 2.

History
The first Camden Road station was opened by the North London Railway in 1850 on the east side of what is now St. Pancras Way. It was renamed Camden Town on 1 July 1870, but closed on 5 December the same year when it was replaced by the current station, a short distance to the west.

Designed by Edwin Henry Horne, it opened as Camden Town by the North London Railway on 5 December 1870, but was renamed Camden Road on 25 September 1950 to avoid confusion with the London Underground Northern line  which had opened in 1907. Thus, between 1907 and 1950, there were two stations called Camden Town. It remains Horne's only station still operating as such.

Between 14 May 1979 and 11 May 1985 Camden Road was the western terminus of the Crosstown Linkline diesel multiple unit service to North Woolwich. 

After the reopening the work continued until May 2011 with a reduced service and none on Sundays.

Location
The station is at the corner of Royal College Street and Camden Road. The present Camden Town London Underground station is 450 metres to the southwest of this station. It is one of the few railway stations in England in which there is a police station.

Services
The typical weekday service in trains per hour is:
 4 westbound to  via 
 4 westbound to Clapham Junction also via Willesden Junction
 8 eastbound to  via .

There is now no normal passenger service on the line from Camden Road to Willesden Junction Low Level via Queens Park, though the route can be (and is) used if the line via Hampstead Heath is blocked for any reason.

In addition to the frequent local passenger service, the station is a busy location for freight traffic due to its proximity to the junctions linking the North London line to both the West Coast Main Line at Camden Junction (via the now closed station at ) and the East Coast Main Line at Copenhagen Junction.

Connections
London Buses routes 29, 46, 253 and 274 and night routes N29, N253 and N279 serve the station.

There is also an official out of station interchange with Northern Line services at the nearby Camden Town underground station.

Future

Camden Highline

In the future there may be a walking connection to and from King's Cross. The Camden Highline is a proposed public park and garden walk transforming a disused section of the North London Line between the two stations.

Potential reinstatement of platform 3

References

External links

Railway stations in the London Borough of Camden
Former North London Railway stations
Railway stations in Great Britain opened in 1850
Railway stations in Great Britain closed in 1870
Railway stations in Great Britain opened in 1870
Railway stations served by London Overground
Camden Town